Stanislaw Krasiński (c. 1558 – 1617) was a Polish–Lithuanian nobleman (szlachcic).

Stanisław was Chorąży of Płock since 1583, castellan of Ciechanów since 1587, of Sierpuchowo since 1590, Castellan of Podlaskie Voivodeship since 1593, of Płock since 1596, voivode of Płock Voivodeship since 1600 and starost of Błońsk.

He was married to Małgorzata Sobiejuska and Anna Michowska. He had five children with Małgorzata Sobiejuska: Franciszek Krasiński, Stanisław Krasiński, Gabriel Krasiński, Elżbieta Krasińska and Zuzanna Krasińska. He had another six children with Anna Michowska: Jan Kazimierz Krasiński, Ludwik Krasiński, Andrzej Krasiński, Zofia Krasińska, Katarzyna Krasińska and Dorota Krasińska.

1550s births
1617 deaths
Stanislaw Krasinski (1558-1617)